Tolna sypnoides is a species of moth of the family Erebidae first described by Arthur Gardiner Butler in 1878. It is found in Nigeria Sierra Leone, Ghana and South Africa, as well as in Madagascar and other islands of the Indian Ocean. They have a wingspan of around 70 mm.

The caterpillars of Tolna sypnoides feed on mango trees (Mangifera indica), Schinus terebinthifolius, both of the family of Anacardiaceae and Syzygium cumini (Myrtaceae).

Gallery

References

Catocalinae
Moths of Madagascar
Moths of Sub-Saharan Africa
Insects of West Africa
Moths of the Comoros
Moths of Mauritius
Moths of Réunion